Caffia Coffee Group is a family-run coffee business, based in Falkirk, Scotland, United Kingdom and offers a range of professional coffee machines and coffee supplies to the workplaces and restaurants market in the UK.

History
Founded as Lomond Coffee Service in November 1985, the company now known as Caffia Coffee Group underwent a re-brand and change of name in summer 2013 – the objective was to create a more  modern image. A small but significant local employer, Caffia has seen good growth and supplies coffee to The Kelpies Sculptures visitor centre in Falkirk on the re-juvenated Forth and Clyde Canal.

The brand
Caffia has red packaging and a range of 8 espresso coffee beans and 8 filter coffee blends; a full range of point of sale items is offered. Gracio Hot Chocolate is also a brand of Caffia Coffee Group.

Showrooms
The company has two showrooms where a range of heavy-duty coffee machines can be seen – one at Falkirk head office and one in  Clerkenwell, London.

Motto
‘Everything from the bean to the cup’ – this reflects the ‘whole package’ approach.

Water filters
The company works with WatchWater water filters using a German-made media that works differently to traditional ion-exchange media for water hardness treatment. These new products include a technology known as  Nucleation Assisted Crystallization (NAC) to break down hard limescale into nano particles that do not attach to coffee machine or boiler elements, nor do they produce a potentially harmful change in water pH to being mildly acidic.

Further reading
Catering Insight: http://www.cateringinsight.com/17796-coffee-equipment-supplier-to-hold-open-day/
Aberdeen Business News: https://web.archive.org/web/20160316024457/http://www.aberdeenbusinessnews.co.uk/component/k2/item/5050-caffia-coffee-group-expands-into-aberdeen
Foodervice Equipment Journal: http://www.foodserviceequipmentjournal.com/caffia-opens-equipment-showroom-in-central-london/
WatchWater Germany Website: https://web.archive.org/web/20160317112102/http://www.watchwater.de/home/home.php

References

External links
  Caffia Coffee Group website
 Gracio Hot Chocolate website

Scottish brands
Coffee companies of the United Kingdom
Food and drink companies of Scotland
Companies based in Falkirk (council area)
Food and drink companies established in 1985
1985 establishments in Scotland